Boreosmittia is a genus of European non-biting midges in the subfamily Orthocladiinae of the bloodworm family (Chironomidae).

Species
A. protensa Sæther, 2000
A. sivertseni (Aagaard, 1979)

References

Chironomidae
Nematocera genera